Ecuador competed at the 2004 Summer Olympics in Athens, Greece, from 13 to 29 August 2004. This was the nation's tenth consecutive appearance at the Olympics, although it had first competed at the 1924 Summer Olympics in Paris.

Ecuadorian Olympic Committee sent a total of 16 athletes, 10 men and 6 women, to compete in 7 sports; there was only a single competitor in boxing, shooting, swimming, and tennis. Five Ecuadorian athletes had previously competed in Sydney, including race walker Jefferson Pérez, who successfully made his fourth Olympic bid as the most experienced member. Meanwhile, tennis player Nicolás Lapentti returned for a major comeback at his second Olympics after an eight-year absence, missing out the previous Games due to injury. Weightlifter and Pan American Games champion Alexandra Escobar was selected to carry the Ecuadorian flag in the opening ceremony.

Ecuador failed to win an Olympic medal for the second consecutive time. Former Olympic champion and race walker Jefferson Pérez missed a chance to grab his second medal after finishing fourth in the men's 20 km walk.

Athletics 

Ecuadorian athletes have so far achieved qualifying standards in the following athletics events (up to a maximum of 3 athletes in each event at the 'A' Standard, and 1 at the 'B' Standard).

Men

Women

Boxing 

Ecuador sent one boxer to the 2004 Summer Olympics.

Judo

Shooting 

Women

Swimming 

Men

Tennis

Weightlifting 

Two Ecuadorian weightlifters qualified for the following events:

See also
Ecuador at the 2003 Pan American Games
Ecuador at the 2004 Summer Paralympics

References

External links
Official Report of the XXVIII Olympiad
Ecuadorian Olympic Committee 

Nations at the 2004 Summer Olympics
2004 Summer Olympics
Summer Olympics